Robert Chunga (born December 17, 1987) better known by his stage name, Bobby East, is a rapper, singer and business man from Lusaka, Zambia.

Career
In 2010, Bobby East recorded his first song. It swiftly became a hit and he eventually rose to fame. He is currently signed to Slap Dee's record label,  XYZ. In 2016, Bobby was elected as the label's CEO.

Discography

Studio albums

Singles

Awards and nominations

References 

Living people
1987 births
21st-century Zambian male singers